Joseph Randolph Mullings (1792 – 18 October 1859) was a British Conservative politician.

Mullings was elected Conservative MP for Cirencester at a by-election in 1848—caused by the death of William Cripps—and held the seat until 1859 when he stepped down.

References

External links
 

UK MPs 1847–1852
UK MPs 1852–1857
UK MPs 1857–1859
1792 births
1859 deaths
Conservative Party (UK) MPs for English constituencies